Arayez (also Romanized as Ārāyez, ‘Arayeẕ, ‘Arāyeẕ, ‘Arayyeẕ, and ‘Arīyẕ) is a village in Howmeh-ye Gharbi Rural District, in the Central District of Khorramshahr County, Khuzestan Province, Iran. At the 2006 census, its population was 97, in 20 families.

References 

Populated places in Khorramshahr County